Hsieh Yi-fong (born 12 July 1977) is a Taiwanese politician.

She was elected to the Legislative Yuan in 2020 for Changhua County's third constituency.

Early life
Hsieh Yi-fong holds a doctorate from National Chengchi University.

Political career
Hsieh won election to the Legislative Yuan in 2020, as a Kuomintang representative of Changhua County's third constituency.

References

External links

 

1977 births
Living people
National Chengchi University alumni
21st-century Taiwanese women politicians
Members of the 10th Legislative Yuan
Kuomintang Members of the Legislative Yuan in Taiwan
Changhua County Members of the Legislative Yuan